My Date with Drew is a 2004 independent documentary film starring and directed by Brian Herzlinger. The film uses guerrilla filmmaking and received several awards.

Synopsis
Since he first saw E.T. the Extra-Terrestrial as a boy, Herzlinger has had a crush on its star Drew Barrymore. Now, more than 20 years later, Herzlinger combines his passions for filmmaking and Drew Barrymore to document his quest for a date with the actress. With $1,100 he won at a game show (the winning answer being "Drew Barrymore") and a digital video camera, he has 30 days to complete his documentary before he has to return the camera under Circuit City's 30-day return policy.

Awards
 2004 Gen Art Film Festival – Audience Award
 2004 U.S. Comedy Arts Festival – Audience Award
 2004 Vail Film Festival – Festival Award

References

External links
 
 

2004 films
2004 documentary films
American independent films
Documentary films about actors
Documentary films about the cinema of the United States
American documentary films
Drew Barrymore
Films directed by Jon Gunn
2000s English-language films
2000s American films